The Coalition of Urban and Metropolitan Universities (CUMU) is an organization mostly of U.S. universities located in metropolitan areas. CUMU was founded in 1989 by 10 university presidents gathered at Wright State University. CUMU is headquartered at Towson University in Towson, Maryland.

The organization publishes Metropolitan Universities journal, a scholarly publication addressing the issues facing urban and metropolitan-serving institutions, such as civic engagement, leadership, and shared academic spaces. As of 2016, the journal is published entirely online on a quarterly basis.

Governance

The CUMU Executive Committee is composed of presidents and chancellors of member institutions. Executive Committee members are elected to two-year terms during the annual Presidents meeting at the CUMU Annual Conference in October. In 2012, the President was Wendell Pritchett, former Chancellor of Rutgers University–Camden, Interim Dean and Presidential Professor at the University of Pennsylvania Law School, and Provost of the University of Pennsylvania. The current CUMU president is Tom George, Chancellor of University of Missouri–St. Louis.

CUMU Standing Committees are chaired by a member President who serves on the Executive Committee and are elected at the annual CUMU conference to serve two-year terms. Membership on the standing committees is open to member Presidents and Administrators.

Membership

United States
 - University of Arkansas at Little Rock
 - Campuses of the California State University (Dominguez Hills, Fullerton, Los Angeles, California State University, Northridge, San Bernardino, and San Marcos)
 - Metropolitan State University of Denver, University of Colorado Denver, University of Colorado Colorado Springs, University of Denver*
 - American University*, Georgetown University*, University of the District of Columbia
 - Florida Atlantic University, Florida International University, Miami Dade College, University of North Florida
 - Northeastern Illinois University, Southern Illinois University Edwardsville
 - Indiana University Northwest, Indiana University – Purdue University Indianapolis, Purdue University Fort Wayne, University of Southern Indiana
 - University of Louisville
 - Louisiana State University in Shreveport
 - University of Southern Maine
 - University System of Maryland, Coppin State University, Morgan State University, Towson University, University of Baltimore
 - University of Massachusetts Boston, University of Massachusetts Lowell, Worcester State University
 - Oakland University, University of Michigan-Dearborn, University of Michigan-Flint, Wayne State University
 - Augsburg University*, Metropolitan State University, University of Minnesota
 - Jackson State University
 - Missouri State University, University of Missouri-Kansas City, University of Missouri-St. Louis - University of Missouri Extension
 - University of Nebraska at Omaha
 - University of Nevada, Las Vegas
 - Rutgers–Camden, Rutgers–Newark, Rutgers University – New Brunswick
 - Buffalo State College, College of Staten Island, Manhattanville College*, Medgar Evers College, Pace University*, Syracuse University*, Wagner College*
 - University of North Carolina at Charlotte, University of North Carolina at Greensboro, UNC Wilmington
 - Ohio State University, Wright State University
 - University of Central Oklahoma
 - Portland State University
 - Cabrini University*, Gannon University*, Temple University, Widener University*
 - Rhode Island College
 - University of South Carolina Upstate
 - University of Tennessee at Chattanooga
 - University of Houston–Downtown, University of North Texas at Dallas, Texas State University
 - Weber State University
 - Old Dominion University, Virginia Commonwealth University, Virginia Wesleyan University*
 - Washington State University Tri-Cities, Washington State University Vancouver
 - Marquette University*, University of Wisconsin–Green Bay, University of Wisconsin–Milwaukee

=private

Canada
 - MacEwan University
 - York University
=private

References

External links
 Coalition of Urban and Metropolitan Universities—Official web site
 Metropolitan Universities journal — Official web site

Organizations based in Maryland
College and university associations and consortia in the United States
International college and university associations and consortia